Bolshemurashkinsky District is an administrative district (raion), one of the forty in Nizhny Novgorod Oblast, Russia. Municipally, it is incorporated as Bolshemurashkinsky Municipal District. It is located in the center of the oblast. Its administrative center is the urban locality (a work settlement) of Bolshoye Murashkino. Population: 10,508 (2010 Census);  The population of Bolshoye Murashkino accounts for 52.9% of the district's total population.

History
The district was established in 1929.

Notable residents 

Avvakum (1620/21 in Grigorovo – 1682), protopope of the Kazan Cathedral who led the opposition to Patriarch Nikon's reforms of the Russian Orthodox Church
Sergei Vaganov (born 1985 in Bolshoye Murashkino), football player

References

Notes

Sources

Districts of Nizhny Novgorod Oblast
States and territories established in 1929
 
